Mel Williams (1 June 1926 – 25 September 2003) was an  Australian rules footballer who played with Hawthorn in the Victorian Football League (VFL).

Notes

External links 

1926 births
2003 deaths
Australian rules footballers from Victoria (Australia)
Hawthorn Football Club players